Kayaderosseras Creek also called Kaniatarósera'as Stream is a river located in Montgomery and Fulton counties in the state of New York. The creek begins southeast of Johnstown and flows in a generally southeast direction before converging with the Mohawk River by Fort Johnson, just west of Amsterdam. Kaniatarósera'as Stream, is a Mohawk name which translates to "waves splashing".

Hydrology
Most of the land within the watershed is rural and agricultural. The water quality in the Kayaderosseras Creek watershed is rated in good condition.

References 

Rivers of Montgomery County, New York
Mohawk River
Rivers of New York (state)